William Mitchell Nash (June 24, 1865 – November 15, 1929) was a Major League Baseball third baseman.

Career statistics

In 15 seasons, Nash was in 1553 games played, compiling a .275 batting average (1616-5867), with 271 doubles, 87 triples, 60 home runs, 983 RBIs, 805 walks, a .367 on-base percentage, and a .382 slugging percentage.

See also
List of Major League Baseball career runs scored leaders
List of Major League Baseball player-managers

References

External links

, or Retrosheet

1865 births
1929 deaths
19th-century baseball players
Major League Baseball player-managers
Major League Baseball third basemen
Richmond Virginians players
Boston Beaneaters players
Boston Reds (PL) players
Philadelphia Phillies players
Philadelphia Phillies managers
Minor league baseball managers
Richmond Virginias players
Richmond Virginians (minor league) players
Buffalo Bisons (minor league) players
Hartford Indians players
Baseball players from Richmond, Virginia
Burials at Woodlawn Memorial Park Cemetery (Colma, California)